Cagayan de Oro National High School or City High is a public high school located in Cagayan de Oro, Misamis Oriental, Philippines.

History

On August 2, 1965, at the heart of City Central School at Velez Street, Cagayan de Oro rose City High School, manned by the school administrator, Mr. Pedrito D. Acac. Part-time faculty members held classes from five o'clock in the afternoon to eight-thirty in the evening daily, and offered non-academic subjects during Saturdays, in a five-year curriculum.

City High School transferred to its new site at 8th-2nd Streets at Barangay Nazareth in 1990 where the DSWD-X and South City Central extension were stationed at that time. By that time, City High School ran day and night sessions, thereby catering not only to the working students, but also to the full-time professionals.

In February 1993, Mr. Rogelio Q. Mabao took over as the school administrator of Cagayan de Oro National High School. During that time, the school offered SEDP, science school for future curricula which brought in its laurel as "The Most Effective and Efficient Secondary Public High School" in the Division of Cagayan de Oro. An annex was opened at Macanhan in 1999 through the initiative of Ms. Fe L. Pajo, the school administrator who assumed office in January 1997. It continued to offer three curricula, namely Revised Basic Education, Special Science Curriculum and Special Education for the deaf students in the city.

Cagayan de Oro  maintained its title for two years as "The Most Effective and Efficient Secondary Public High School" in the division from 2001-2003. Five of its teachers were named as "Outstanding Teacher in Division and District" – Ms. Tersita L. Jacobe, Ms. Fe A. Elevado, Ms. Jesusa R. Saloma, Ms. Sandy A. Flores, and Ms. Cristine J. Arjona.

Curricula
The school day is divided into three class shifts – morning, afternoon and night.

Information
The school appeared in the local show Mag TV Na Ato Ni!.
The school appeared in the local news TV Patrol Northern Mindanao

High schools in the Philippines
Schools in Cagayan de Oro